Murayama is a Japanese surname. Notable people with the surname include:

Akihiro Murayama (born 1980), Japanese mixed martial artist
, Japanese volleyball player
Kaita Murayama (1896–1919), Japanese author
Milton Murayama (1923-2016), Japanese-Hawaiian novelist and playwright
Noé Murayama (1930–1997), Mexican actor
Shichirō Murayama (1908–1995), a Japanese linguist 
, Japanese rower
, Japanese footballer
Tamotsu Murayama (1905–1968), Director of the Boy Scouts of Japan
Tatsuo Murayama (1915–2010), Japanese politician
, Japanese football manager
Murayama Tōan, Japanese magistrate in 17th-century
Tomohiko Murayama (born 1987), Japanese footballer
Tomiichi Murayama (born 1924), 81st Prime Minister of Japan
Tomoyoshi Murayama (1901–1977), Japanese avant-garde artist
Úrsula Murayama (born 1972), Mexican actress
Wataru Murayama, female Japanese manga writer
Yasuaki Murayama (born 1984), Japanese shogi player
Yoshitaka Murayama, creator of the video game series Suikoden
Yusuke Murayama (born 1981), Japanese former football player

Japanese-language surnames